Mette Oxvang (born 2 December 1937) is a Danish athlete. She competed in the women's high jump at the 1960 Summer Olympics.

References

1937 births
Living people
Athletes (track and field) at the 1960 Summer Olympics
Danish female high jumpers
Olympic athletes of Denmark
Place of birth missing (living people)